Non-equilibrium economics understands economic processes as non-equilibrium phenomena, as opposed to standard neoclassical equilibrium economics. This approach is consistent with our understanding of life processes as non-equilibrium phenomena. It is represented by modern researchers in the fields of evolutionary-institutional economics, Post Keynesian economics, Ecological Economics, development and growth economics. The early contributions to this theory were made by Thorstein Veblen, Gunnar Myrdal, Karl William Kapp and Nicholas Kaldor. Many contributions have been made to this field in recent years, such as "The Foundations of Non-Equilibrium Economics: The Principle of Circular Cumulative Causation" (2009), Routledge.

Related fields of economics include Complexity economics and Evolutionary economics.

See also
 Disequilibrium macroeconomics

References 

Schools of economic thought
Ecological economics